is a Prefectural Natural Park in Tokyo, Japan. It is adjacent to the Chichibu Tama Kai National Park and Takiyama Prefectural Natural Park.

See also
 National Parks of Japan
 Parks and gardens in Tokyo

References

Parks and gardens in Tokyo
Protected areas established in 1953
1953 establishments in Japan